Symphony No. 10 may refer to:

Symphony No. 10 (Beethoven/Cooper) in E-flat major, sketched by Ludwig van Beethoven, c. 1827, assembled by Barry Cooper, 1988
Beethoven's Tenth, nickname of Symphony No. 1 (Brahms) in C minor (Op. 68) by Johannes Brahms, 1855–76
Symphony No. 10 (Brian) in C minor by Havergal Brian, 1953–54
Symphony No. 10 (Davies) (Op. 327, Alla ricerca di Borromini) by Peter Maxwell Davies, 2013
Symphony No. 10 (Diamond) by David Diamond, 1987/2000
Symphony No. 10 (Ficher) (Op. 131) by Jacobo Ficher, 1976–77
Symphony No. 10 (Glass) by Philip Glass, 2011–12
Symphony No. 10 (Haydn) in D major (Hoboken I/10) by Joseph Haydn, c. 1760
Symphony No. 10 (Michael Haydn) in D major (Perger 45, Sherman 8, MH 69) by Michael Haydn, c. 1774
Symphony No. 10 (Henze) by Hans Werner Henze, 1997–2000
Symphony No. 10 (Holmboe) (M. 250) by Vagn Holmboe, 1970–2
Symphony No. 10 (Hovhaness) (Op. 184, Vahaken) by Alan Hovhaness, 1959
Symphony No. 10 (Mahler) in F-sharp major by Gustav Mahler 1910 (unfinished)
Symphony No. 10 (Milhaud) (Op. 382) by Darius Milhaud, 1960
Symphony No. 10 (Mozart) in G major (K. 74) by Wolfgang Amadeus Mozart, 1770
Symphony No. 10 (Myaskovsky) in F minor (Op. 30) by Nikolai Myaskovsky, 1926–27
Symphony No. 10 (Pettersson) by Allan Pettersson, 1971–72
Symphony No. 10 (Rubbra) (Op. 145, da Camera) by Edmund Rubbra
Symphony No. 10 (Schubert) in D major (D 936A, The Last) by Franz Schubert, 1828 (unfinished)
Symphony No. 10 (Schuman) (American Muse) by William Schuman, 1976
Symphony No. 10 (Shostakovich) in E minor (Op. 93) by Dmitri Shostakovich, c. 1953
Symphony No. 10 (Simpson) by Robert Simpson, 1988
Symphony No. 10 (Villa-Lobos) (Sumé pater patrium: Sinfonia ameríndia com coros) by Heitor Villa-Lobos, 1952–53

010